KPP Best is a compilation album by Japanese singer Kyary Pamyu Pamyu, officially released on May 25, 2016. The album was released to celebrate the fifth anniversary of her debut and coincided with the "Five Years Monster World Tour".

A special edition version (limited to 55,555 copies) comes with a third disc of remixes by producer Yasutaka Nakata. A second limited edition (5,555 copies) was released on 1 October 2016, featuring a Hallowe'en-themed cover.

Track listing

Sales
KPP Best was certified Gold by the Recording Industry Association of Japan in November 2016.

References

2016 albums
Albums produced by Yasutaka Nakata
Unborde albums
Kyary Pamyu Pamyu albums